Türkan (also, Turkyany, Tyurkend, Tyurkyan, and Tyurkyany) is a settlement and municipality in Baku, Azerbaijan.  It has a population of 10,108. It means beautiful in Turkish.

References

External links

World Gazetteer: Azerbaijan – World-Gazetteer.com

Populated places in Baku